The England team were very unhappy with the umpiring of the 1958–59 Ashes series, in particular the questionable actions of some bowlers in the Australian team. The televising of Test cricket was in its infancy and the notion of Test umpires using slow-motion replays or other modern techniques was considered absurd. Instead the umpires had to make judgements based on what they saw in a split-second, and honest mistakes were accepted as part and parcel of the game. However, touring teams sometimes felt that there was a natural bias towards the home team which led to some acrimony. Keith Miller thought "Mel McInnes, Colin Hoy and Ron Wright were our leading umpires in the 1954-55 M.C.C. tour of Australia, and I have no hesitation in saying that McInnes gave the finest exhibition of umpiring in a Test series that I have experienced". The England team thought well of him too, but in 1958-59 he lost the confidence of the England players and himself, appeared hesitant and gave some surprising decisions. In the Fourth Test he hesitated to give Ken Mackay out even after the batsman walked after snicking a catch off Brian Statham. Later Colin McDonald should have been run out when Fred Trueman flattened the stumps after his runner Jim Burke ran round the back of McInnes. McInnes gave him out, but then changed his mind and gave him not out as he had not seen whether Burke had made the run or not. On his next ball McDonald sportingly pulled his bat out of the way of the stumps to give Trueman "the easiest Test wicket I have ever taken". Trueman was affected again when he batted, given out caught by Wally Grout off Richie Benaud when he had dropped his bat and missed the ball. The England team became dispirited by the umpiring mistakes and, believing the officials to be against them, lost heart. As Fred Trueman wrote

...the Australian umpires demonstrated as much impartiality as a religious zealot. We just couldn't get favourable decisions and they no-balled England bowlers left, right and centre...one of the umpires consistently no-balled me...It was annoying, especially as this umpire seemed to allow Gordon Rorke to bowl with both his feet over the front line!...I suffered, as did others, from appalling umpiring decisions when batting...It was unbelievable."

Throwing
There was much comment in the Press box as to the legitimacy of this delivery but Meckiff certainly generated a considerable amount of pace. It is always difficult to assess exactly whether a bowler is throwing and it is something of which one must be sure before being too dogmatic. Once a bowler is condemned for throwing his career is finished and it is a great step to take by any umpire, especially so in a Test match...he certainly looks very much like a thrower. The umpires, however, are satisfied that he is all right and they are the judges.
Alec Bedser  
In cricket to throw the ball when bowling is illegal and results in a no-ball, but until 1960 it was undefined and it took a strong minded umpire confident of the backing of the authorities to call a bowler for this offence. To accuse a bowler of throwing was to call in question his sportsmanship, in effect to call him a cheat, and could result in libel charges by the offended bowler. A bowler who threw the ball  increased his pace, from slow to medium or medium to fast, and the whip of the wrist altered the line of the ball, variations that could easily dismiss a batsman. When applied to short-pitched deliveries the speed and inconsistent bounce of a "chucker" could be very dangerous, as demonstrated by the feared West Indian fast bowler Charlie Griffith. Another difficulty for the umpires was that although the upright straight arm was the ideal many bowlers had a slightly bent bowling arm without throwing the ball, and of course leg spinners used a strong wrist action, so it was not easy to sort out the innocent from the guilty. Sir Donald Bradman said "It is the most complex question I have known in cricket, because it is not a matter of fact, but a matter of opinion and interpretation. It is so involved that two men of equal good will and sincerity could take opposite views".

Dragging
...and as for photographic evidence! They produced this of Lindwall once, which showed clearly that his back foot was either over the line or in the air before the ball was delivered, but on the eve of the 1948 tour of England and a pending dispute about Lindwall, in particular, somebody let the story out that Tate and Larwood were also shown once in a film to be over the line before the ball was delivered. As O'Reilly vehemently argues, it is humanly impossible for a ball to be delivered legitimately with the back foot still on the ground and behind the line, and so everybody forgot about that one.
Jack Fingleton</blockquote>
<blockquote>Trying to recall who was responsible for the front-foot law is a tax on the memory. Some will say it was Gordon Rorke. Others would want the privilege shared by Fred Trueman and Frank Tyson and a couple of South Australian pace bowlers, Peter Trethewey and Alan Hitchcox. I am more inclined to lean towards Con Simons and Pat Crawford.Richie Benaud, 1980  
In modern cricket the bowler is no-balled if he bowls without some part of the front foot (either grounded or raised) behind the popping crease and if his back foot is not wholly inside the return crease. In the 1950s the front foot rule had not been written, so the requirement was that one foot be behind the bowling crease. The 1958-59 series was a catalyst towards the change as fast bowlers tended to drag the toe of their rear foot over the bowling crease in order to decrease the distance between them and the batsmen when they released the ball. If they timed it well the delivery was made when the toe was still behind the crease, but sometimes they would drag it over the line and they would be no-balled. The dust raised by the dragging foot and the distance between the bowling hand and the dragging foot of some six or seven feet made it difficult for umpires to make the correct decision. As you can see on this old cine film of Ray Lindwall dragging his foot over the bowling crease. See Film on YouTube. It should have been called as a no-ball as his rear foot was past the crease when he delivered the ball, easy to see in a slow motion replay, but difficult for the umpire and impossible for the bowler.

Australia
Jim Burke: Burke was an opening batsman whose occasional off spin bowling brought him 12 Test wickets (28.75) and whose action was likened to a policeman hitting a small offender with a truncheon. He was no-balled for throwing in grade cricket and Benaud was reluctant to use him in the Tests. E.W. Swanton wrote "I am sorry that the chief memory of him is that he was the worst chucker I ever saw bowl, bracketed equal with Meckiff and the South African, Griffen: that and the memory of his piano playing - off the field in fact no one was better company". Even his own Sydney crowd shouted "give him a coconut" when he hit the stumps with his bowling 
Ray Lindwall: Like Trueman Lindwall's action was a text book model, but he was known for his heavy drag, and Rorke was described as having "an even more phenomenal drag than Lindwall". Even so, "When Australia blooded some fast bowlers with distinctly dubious actions against England in 1958, it was a pleasure to avert the eyes from the bent elbows and feast on the purity and beauty of Lindwall's action".
Ian Meckiff: Ian Meckiff's bowling action The biggest culprit in English eyes was the "jerky erratic Meckiff". who took 17 wickets (17.17) in the series, but dragged his foot and his "action was generally conceded to constitute a throw". Several former English and Australian Test players stated that his action was illegal; Jack Fingleton, Keith Miller, Alf Gover, Ernie McCormick, Ian Peebles and Johnny Wardle, as did many in the England team;  Trevor Bailey, Jim Laker, Peter Richardson and Fred Trueman. Meckiff was defended by his captain Richie Benaud said he was "completely satisfied that his delivery was fair and legitimate". and Jack Pollard, who wrote "Meckiff, in fact, went to the crease with a beautifully relaxed approach, paused momentarily with his arm absolutely straight, and then let the ball go with a blurred swing of the arm that was impossible to follow from 60 yards away, even with the aid of good binoculars". The England manager Freddie Brown wanted to make an official complaint about Meckiff's bowling after the First Test, but captain Peter May declined as it would look like sour grapes. Instead they talked unofficially to the Australian chairman of selectors Sir Donald Bradman who retorted "And what of the action of the England bowlers Tony Lock and Peter Loader?" and that they should "first of all put their own house in order". May never did make an official complaint, but "Englishmen who fell to Meckiff's speed and lively lift were hardly happy at being victims of deliveries that began with a bent arm and finished with a pronounced wrist-whip". He was subsequently no-balled for throwing twice in the Sheffield Shield, but his career was ended when Australian umpire Colin Egar no-balled him four times in his first over against South Africa in the First Test at Brisbane in 1963-64. Some thought this was arranged for the benefit of sporting relations, but Meckiff never played cricket again.
Gordon Rorke: Gordon Rorke's bowling action A six-foot five-inch "Blond Giant", Rorke was the fastest Australian bowler and accused of throwing by the English press, but this paled beside his excessive dragging. With his gigantic seven foot stride and yard long drag he could be only eighteen yards from the batsman when he finally delivered the ball and at times seemed impossible to score from. Fred Trueman was no-balled for dragging his foot a couple of inches over the crease and wrote "It was really annoying as this umpire seemed to allow Gordon Rorke to bowl with both his feet over the front line!" One picture showed him with his rear foot past the bowling crease before he had even begun to drag and Colin Cowdrey joked "I was frightened that he might tread on my toes".
Keith Slater: Slater was another bowler accused of throwing during the series, but as he only took 2 Test wickets for 110 runs he was not considered to be a major problem. At the MCC's first game in Perth Keith Miller wrote "this pencil-slim youngster bowled off-spinners in the first innings with a highly suspect and jerky action...but no one bothered much about him because of his comparatively modest success. The balloon really went up in the second innings when he used the new ball...I thought he looked less like a chucker when bowling quick but the M.C.C. were incensed".

England
Peter Loader: A whippet-thin Surrey fast-medium bowler accused of "chucking" because his bouncers were noticeably faster than his normal delivery. Frank Tyson wrote "His inexplicable wide range of pace has from time to time, raised the suspicion of a 'kink' in his action. He can certainly generate a great deal of speed for a man who is of slender build".
Tony Lock: The Surrey slow-medium left arm bowler Tony Lock was called for no-balling in a county match in 1952 and by a West Indian umpire after he bowled George Headley in the Kingston Test match of 1953-54. Lock's bent arm action, the result of practicing in a Croydon indoor school with its low ceiling, had caused grumblings for years, especially with his wicket-taking faster ball. Unlike modern players with access to television highlights and close-up videos of their play, Lock never saw his own action until shown a film when touring New Zealand in 1958-59. The horrified bowler completely re-modelled his bowling action to eliminate the "kink" in his arm, and removed the faster ball from his repertoire.
Fred Trueman: Fred Trueman was an outspoken critic of Australian throwing actions; "I believed Meckiff's action to be totally illegal and he should never have been allowed to play". Amazingly, Meckiff returned the compliment by describing Trueman as "a Thrower" in a book he wrote several years later. Trueman, whose classic side on bowling action was considered a model, was an unlikely candidate for such an accusation. Like all fast bowlers Trueman dragged his foot over the crease and was no-balled for it, but found it annoying that Australian bowlers were not treated the same even though they had both feet over the return crease. Another problem was the long spikes he wore which made everybody talk about "Freddie's big boots ploughing up the wicket for the benefit of Lock".
Frank Tyson:  Australian newspapers had accused Tyson of dragging in the 1954-55 tour and an English newspaper responded; "Will Tyson be "sacrificed" to avoid any risk of giving the Australians a chance to scream that Tyson persistently bowls no-balls by foot-drag over the crease?" with pictures of his bowling action. In the match between the Victoria and the M.C.C he was photographed dragging his foot 18 inches past the crease, but Pat Crawford of New South Wales was photographed with his foot 36 inches over the crease. The caption read "Oh Tyson. You are an Angel compared to Pat!". An enterprising Sydney newspaper paid Harold Larwood to give his name to an article declaring "Replay Tests - Tyson Not Fair". Despite his exceptional pace "Typhoon Tyson" does not appear to ever been accused of throwing the ball.

References

Bibliography
 
 
 Ashley Brown, The Pictorial History of Cricket, Bison Books, 1988
 Cris Freddi, The Guinness Book of Cricket Blunders, Guinness Publishing, 1996
 Keith Miller, Cricket From the Grandstand, Oldbourne, 1959
 Tom Graveney with Norman Giller, The Ten Greatest Test Teams, Sidgewick & Jackson, 1988
 E.W. Swanton, Swanton in Australia, with MCC 1946-1975, Fontana, 1977
 Fred Trueman, As It Was, The Memoirs of Fred Trueman, Pan Books, 2004

Annual reviews
 Playfair Cricket Annual 1959
 Wisden Cricketers' Almanack 1960

Further reading
 
 
 Richie Benaud, A tale of two Tests: With some thoughts on captaincy, Hodder & Stoughton, 1962
 Mark Browning, Richie Benaud: Cricketer, Captain, Guru, Kangaroo Press, 1996
 Robert Coleman, Seasons In the Sun: the Story Of the Victorian Cricket Association, Hargreen Publishing, 1993.
 Bill Frindall, The Wisden Book of Test Cricket 1877-1978, Wisden, 1979
 David Frith, Pageant of Cricket, The Macmillan Company of Australia, 1987
 David Frith, England Versus Australia: An Illustrated History of Every Test Match Since 1877, Viking, 2007
 Chris Harte, A History of Australian Cricket, Andre Deutsch, 1993
 Ken Kelly and David Lemmon, Cricket Reflections : Five Decades of Cricket Photographs, Heinemann, 1985
 Alban George Moyes, Benaud & Co: The story of the Tests, 1958-1959, Angus & Robertson, 1959
 Ray Robinson, On Top Down Under, Cassell, 1975
 E.W. Swanton (ed), The Barclays World of Cricket, Collins, 1986
 
 Bernard Whimpress, Chuckers: A history of throwing in Australian cricket, Elvis Press, 2004.
 Bob Willis and Patrick Murphy, Starting with Grace, Stanley Paul, 1986

1958 in Australian cricket
1958 in English cricket
1959 in Australian cricket
1959 in English cricket
1958
Cricket umpiring